Rūdolfs Vītols (April 15, 1892 – March 4, 1942) was a Latvian track and field athlete who competed for the Russian Empire in the 1912 Summer Olympics. In 1912 he was eliminated in the first round of the 1500 metres competition.

References

External links
list of Latvian athletes

1892 births
1942 deaths
Latvian male middle-distance runners
Olympic competitors for the Russian Empire
Athletes (track and field) at the 1912 Summer Olympics
Male middle-distance runners from the Russian Empire